The Multilateral Investment Fund (MIF) is an independent fund administered by the Inter-American Development Bank (IDB), created in 1993 to support private sector development in Latin America and the Caribbean. In partnership with business organizations, governments, and non-governmental organizations (NGOs), MIF's stated goal is to provide technical assistance and investments to support micro and small business growth, build worker skills, and to improve markets and access to finance.

MIF reports having approved more than 1000 projects, mainly grants, with over 800 civil society, private sector, and government partners. Also according to MIF, the fund works in all 26 developing member countries of the IDB, and together with its partners has financed $2.5 billion in project funding.

Project thematic areas 

MIF describes itself as supporting private sector development projects in Latin America and the Caribbean in areas including remittances, microfinance, venture capital, sustainable tourism, trade and investment, public-private partnerships, entrepreneurship, corporate social responsibility, technology, and youth training, among others. MIF has invested in a number of venture capital/private equity funds, including Vox Capital’s Impact Investing Fund I (Brazil), Aureos Capital's Emerge Central America Growth Fund (EMERGE) (Costa Rica, Belize, Mexico, El Salvador), CoreCo's Central America I LP Fund (Guatemala, Belize, Honduras, El Salvador, Nicaragua, Costa Rica, Panama, and Dominican Republic), and Leopard Capital’s Haiti Fund (Haiti).

Donor countries 

MIF has 39 donating member countries from Latin America and the Caribbean, North America, Europe, and Asia. The Donors Committee governs MIF and approves all projects. Voting shares are based on the contribution amount of each country:

Argentina, Bahamas, Barbados, Belize, Bolivia, Brazil, Canada, Chile, China, Colombia, Costa Rica, Dominican Republic, Ecuador, El Salvador, France, Guatemala, Guyana, Haiti, Honduras, Italy, Jamaica, Japan, Korea, Mexico, Netherlands, Nicaragua, Panama, Paraguay, Peru, Portugal, Spain, Suriname, Sweden, Switzerland, Trinidad and Tobago, United Kingdom, United States, Uruguay, and Venezuela.

References

External links
Multilateral Investment Fund- MIF (official site)

International development agencies
Multilateral development banks